= Radial fracture =

A radial fracture may refer to:

- A fracture following a radius direction
- A fracture of the radius bone
